Maarten Grobbe (7 September 1901 – 13 May 1961) was a Dutch footballer. He played in two matches for the Netherlands national football team from 1928 to 1929.

References

External links
 

1901 births
1961 deaths
Dutch footballers
Netherlands international footballers
Place of birth missing
Association footballers not categorized by position